The Bluejackets is a 1922 Dutch silent film directed by Maurits Binger.

Cast
 Beppie De Vries - Blonde Greet
 Maurits de Vries - Dolle Dries
 Johan Elsensohn - De Schele, de verloofde van Toffe Jans
 Louis Davids - De Blauwe
 Piet Urban - De Mop
 Adrienne Solser - Na Druppel
 André van Dijk - Leendert
 Paula de Waart - Moeder van De Blauwe
 Beppie Murray - Doortje
 Hans Bruning - Vader van De Blauwe
 Greta Meyer - Toffe Jans
 Chris Laurentius - Oom Gerrit
 Riek Kloppenburg - Tante Piet
 Ka Bos - Betje, kaartlegster
 Matthieu van Eysden

External links 
 

1922 films
Dutch silent feature films
Dutch black-and-white films
Films directed by Maurits Binger